Canyonville is a city in Douglas County, Oregon, United States. The population was 1,884 at the 2010 census. The main regional tourist attraction, the Seven Feathers Casino Resort is in Canyonville.

Geography
Canyon Creek flows through Canyonville, where it joins the South Umpqua River.

Climate 
Canyonville is classified as having a Mediterranean climate (Köppen Csb), with some characteristics of an oceanic climate (Cfb) due to its cool temperatures. Winters are cool, gray and rainy, while summers are warm and dry.

Demographics

2010 census
According to the census of 2010, there were 1,884 people, 756 households, and 470 families living in the city. The racial makeup of the city was 86.3% White, 0.4% African American, 2.7% Native American, 4.6% Asian, 1.6% from other races, and 4.5% of two or more races. Hispanic or Latino of any race were 5.5% of the population.

Of the 756 households, 24.6% had children under the age of 18 living with them; 45.5% were married couples living together; 12.2% had a female householder with no husband present; 4.5% had a male householder with no wife present; and 37.8% were non-families. 31.3% of all households were individuals, and in 16.5% there was someone living alone who was 65 years of age or older. The average household size was 2.4, and the average family size was 2.79.

The city's median age was 46.5 years. 22.8% of residents were under the age of 18; 8.3% were between the ages of 18 and 24; 17.4% were from 25 to 44; 25.2% were from 45 to 64; and 26.4% were 65 years of age or older. The city's gender makeup was 49.5% male and 50.5% female.

2000 census
As of the census of 2000, there were 1,293 people, 534 households, and 341 families living in the city. The population density was 1,411.6 people per square mile. There were 580 housing units at an average density of 633.2 per square mile. The racial makeup of the city was 91.88% White, 0.15% African American, 3.40% Native American, 0.85% Asian, 0.23% Pacific Islander, 0.54% from other races, and 2.94% from two or more races. Hispanic or Latino of any race were 3.17% of the population.

There were 534 households, out of which 25.3% had children under the age of 18 living with them, 49.6% were married couples living together, 10.1% had a female householder with no husband present, and 36.0% were non-families. 30.0% of all households were made up of individuals, and 15.7% had someone living alone who was 65 years of age or older. The average household size was 2.41 and the average family size was 2.97.

In the city, the population was spread out, with 24.1% under the age of 18, 7.8% from 18 to 24, 22.3% from 25 to 44, 25.7% from 45 to 64, and 20.2% who were 65 years of age or older. The median age was 42 years. For every 100 females, there were 92.7 males. For every 100 females age 18 and over, there were 89.6 males.

The median income for a household in the city was $27,674, and the median income for a family was $31,500. Males had a median income of $30,240 versus $17,417 for females. The per capita income for the city was $14,017. About 15.8% of families and 17.0% of the population were below the poverty line, including 15.4% of those under age 18 and 19.0% of those age 65 or over.

References

External links
 
 Entry for Canyonville in the Oregon Blue Book

 
Cities in Oregon
Cities in Douglas County, Oregon
1901 establishments in Oregon
Populated places established in 1901